In special and general relativity, the four-current (technically the four-current density) is the four-dimensional analogue of the electric current density. Also known as vector current, it is used in the geometric context of four-dimensional spacetime, rather than three-dimensional space and time separately. Mathematically it is a four-vector, and is Lorentz covariant.

Analogously, it is possible to have any form of "current density", meaning the flow of a quantity per unit time per unit area. See current density for more on this quantity.

This article uses the summation convention for indices. See covariance and contravariance of vectors for background on raised and lowered indices, and raising and lowering indices on how to switch between them.

Definition

Using the Minkowski metric  of metric signature , the four-current components are given by:

where
 is the speed of light;
 is the volume charge density;
 is the conventional current density; 
The dummy index  labels the spacetime dimensions.

Motion of charges in spacetime

This can also be expressed in terms of the four-velocity by the equation:

where:
  is the charge density measured by an inertial observer O who sees  the electric current moving at speed  (the magnitude of the 3-velocity);
  is “the rest charge density”, i.e., the charge density for a comoving observer (an observer moving at the speed  - with respect to the inertial observer O - along with the charges).

Qualitatively, the change in charge density (charge per unit volume) is due to the contracted volume of charge due to Lorentz contraction.

Physical interpretation 

Charges (free or as a distribution) at rest will appear to remain at the same spatial position for some interval of time (as long as they're stationary). When they do move, this corresponds to changes in position, therefore the charges have velocity, and the motion of charge constitutes an electric current. This means that charge density is related to time, while current density is related to space.

The four-current unifies charge density (related to electricity) and current density (related to magnetism) in one electromagnetic entity.

Continuity equation 

In special relativity, the statement of charge conservation is that the Lorentz invariant divergence of J is zero:

where  is the four-gradient. This is the continuity equation.

In general relativity, the continuity equation is written as:

where the semi-colon represents a covariant derivative.

Maxwell's equations 

The four-current appears in two equivalent formulations of Maxwell's equations, in terms of the four-potential when the Lorenz gauge condition is fulfilled:

where  is the D'Alembert operator, or the electromagnetic field tensor:

where μ0 is the permeability of free space and ∇β is the covariant derivative.

General relativity 

In general relativity, the four-current is defined as the divergence of the electromagnetic displacement, defined as

then

Quantum field theory 

The four-current density of charge is an essential component of the Lagrangian density used in quantum electrodynamics. In 1956 Gershtein and Zeldovich considered the conserved vector current (CVC) hypothesis for electroweak interactions.

See also
 Four-vector
 Noether's theorem
 Covariant formulation of classical electromagnetism
 Ricci calculus

References

Electromagnetism
Four-vectors